Driver licences in Australia refer to the official permit required for a person to legally drive a motor vehicle in Australia. The issue of driver licences, alongside the regulation and enforcement of road use, are all managed by state and territory governments.

As no Australia-wide licensing scheme exists, rules for the issue of licences vary by jurisdiction. Nevertheless, licences are generally recognised and valid in other states and territories. Since 1997, nationwide uniform arrangements have been in place for the regulation of full drivers licences for motor vehicles, as well as their renewal.

Australia's lack of identity cards has led to driving licences becoming the de facto photo ID used in everyday situations. In 2017, the federal government proposed creation of a national drivers licence database that would involve state or territory governments handing over the identities of drivers in a stated bid to toughen national security laws. The national ID database would be used to monitor public events, but could be transferred to a national drivers licence system with agreement from the states.

Classes of licences
All states and territories in Australia have a uniform driver licence system.

The medical standards for drivers of commercial vehicles are set by the National Transport Commission and Austroads.

The driver of a vehicle carrying paying passengers (such as a school bus or tourist coach) is required to hold a driver licence depending on the size of the vehicle as well as a "Public Passenger Vehicle Driver Authority" which is issued by the state or territory Ministry of Transport.

Some states issue driver's licenses for particular transmissions only. Drivers with an automatic-approved license are not able to drive manual-transmission vehicles, whereas manual-approved drivers are able to operate both. States such as South Australia have no such differentiation, and can drive both regardless of which they learnt with.

Car licences – rules by jurisdiction

Terms
The official nomenclature for car licences varies in the states and territories, for example, "Driver's Licence" or "Driver Licence". However, "Driver's Licence" is most commonly used.

The official names for learners also vary, for example, "Learner Driver Licences" or "Learner's Permit", although they are commonly referred to as "L-platers".

GLS comparison

Australian Capital Territory
The driving age in the Australian Capital Territory is 17 years, but after obtaining a licence, a driver is subject to restrictions during a three-year probationary period.

New South Wales
The minimum driving age in New South Wales is 16 years. The government introduced the Graduated Licensing Scheme in 2000 and therefore learners progress from a learner licence, to a provisional P1 licence, to a provisional P2 licence and finally to a full licence over an extended period of time. After obtaining a licence, a driver continues to be subject to restrictions during a three-year probationary period.

 As of 20 November 2017, the Hazard Perception Test, became a requirement for learner drivers to progress to P1 Provisional license.

P1 and P2 drivers are also prohibited from driving a vehicle with a power-to-weight ratio of or greater than 130 kilowatts per tonne as of 1 August 2014, replacing the previous law of being prohibited from driving vehicles with 8 or more cylinders and being turbocharged or supercharged (diesel vehicles exempt) If a P1 or P2 licence holder is disqualified by a court for a serious driving offence, they will have a one-passenger condition imposed on them at all times while on their P1 or P2 licence. It is also worth noting that any time a P1 or P2 licence is suspended or disqualified will NOT count towards the 12 months/24 months needed for the holder to progress to a P2/full licence.

 A provisional P2 licence (commonly known as Ps and Greens) is gained after one year on P1 license. The driver is restricted to a speed limit of 100 km/h, a zero alcohol limit and a maximum of seven demerit points; however, they are eligible to upgrade the class of their licence to those for heavier vehicles, to a maximum of a Heavy Combination (HC). P2 drivers must conspicuously display a green-on-white "P-plate" on the exterior of the vehicle at all times. P2 drivers must hold the licence for two years before progressing to the next stage. From 1 December 2016, P2 licence holders will no longer be permitted to use a mobile phone at all while driving or riding.

These are ID cards issued for non-drivers by the Roads and Maritime Services.

Northern Territory
The learner licence may be obtained at age 16. Learner drivers may not use a mobile phone and must be supervised by a full licence holder and may not drive faster than 80 km/h. After holding the learner licence for six months a provisional licence may be obtained. Once the provisional licence is obtained, it must be held for a minimum of 2 years before obtaining the full Northern Territory licence.

Source: Northern Territory Department of Transport

Queensland

South Australia

Note: Drivers on their provisional or learners license follow their own state's imposed limits while driving in other states. While driving on a SA license in states with a provisional and learner license imposed maximum speed limit less than 100 km/h, drivers are able to still drive at 100 km/h, while local P and L platers are subject to their own state's restrictions, such as 90 km/h in New South Wales. This means that South Australian provisional or learner drivers may be pulled over more frequently than local drivers.

Tasmania

 As of 2 March 2015; L2 drivers have new speed restrictions in which they can drive at 90 km/h in a 90 or 100 zone and at 100 km/h in a 110 zone.

Note: there are no vehicle restrictions in Tasmania.

Victoria
The minimum driving age in Victoria is 18 years. A learner can drive at the age of 16 under the supervision of a fully licensed driver since 1966. After obtaining a licence, a driver continues to be subject to restrictions during a 4-year probationary period.

On 1 July 2014, the rules were again modified, to distinguish between vehicles manufactured before 1 January 2010, and those manufactured after. Probationary drivers are now permitted to drive any vehicle manufactured after 1 January 2010 that does not have a power-to-mass ratio of greater than 130 kilowatts per tonne, and does not have a modified engine for increased performance. Vehicles manufactured before 1 January 2010 remain subject to previous restrictions, which include a restriction on engines larger than a V6, and cars that have a turbocharger or supercharger.

After 1 July 2008, those aged over 21 years when applying for a licence qualify as P2 drivers after passing the computerised Hazard Perception Test and a practical driving test, as well as an eyesight test.

Western Australia

The driving age in Western Australia is 17 years. A learner can drive at the age of 16 under the supervision of a fully licensed driver. After obtaining a licence, a driver continues to be subject to restrictions during a 2-year probationary period.

Note: there are no vehicle restrictions in Western Australia.

Graduated demerit points
As of 1 December 2010, the Western Australian Government introduced a new Graduated Demerit Point system for Novice Drivers (which includes L- and P-plate drivers). Under this system, a driver may accrue less than 4 demerit points within the first year of their provisional licence, and less than 8 points within the second year, before losing their licence. These limits include demerit points accrued before these 1- and 2-year periods.

Full driver's licence
The provisional licence automatically converts into a full driver's licence after the 2-year probationary period. Drivers with full driver's licences must drive with a blood alcohol content less than 0.05%, may accrue less than 12 demerit points before being disqualified, and may drive at up to 110 km/h (the maximum speed limit in the state). 'P' plate drivers may also drive up to 110 km /h, where permitted by the state.

WA has two classes of drivers licence:
C which enables one to drive any vehicle weighing less than 4.5 tonnes
C-A which enables one to drive any vehicle fitted with an automatic transmission and weighing less than 4.5 tonnes. Refer

Double or nothing
Drivers who have accrued 12 or more demerit points can choose to continue driving on a 12-month Good Behaviour Period. If more than two demerit points are accrued during the 12-month period (even on different fines), the licence is lost for twice the original disqualification period; usually 6 months (3 months x 2).

Identification

Australia does not have a national identity card, and driver's licences are  commonly used as a means of photo identification. Photo cards are also available, especially for non-drivers. Beside identification, these may be used as proof of age for entry to venues which have age restrictions, such as premises where alcohol is sold.

Licences and photo cards are hologrammed, and contain a photograph, signature, the holder's address, and date of birth.

Electronic online identification can be (partly) established using a driver's licence for online applications for some services such as SIM card activation, and opening bank accounts.

The Australian Attorney-General's Department provides a document verification service that allows for validation of some licences.

Many issuing authorities such as NSW allow for an online check of the validity of a driver's licence.

Digital Driver Licences

New South Wales 
The Digital Driver Licence was first trialled in Sydney's Eastern Suburbs, Dubbo and Albury before being rolled out statewide in October 2019. Under the system, Digital Driver Licences are available through the Service NSW app. The app allows licences to show dynamic content including demerit points, expiry date, suspension details and licence conditions. Drivers will continue to receive a physical licence card for backup purposes in addition to interstate and overseas usage.

South Australia 
South Australia became the first state to officially roll out digital driver's licences via its mySA GOV smartphone app in October 2017. The app allows licences to show dynamic content including demerit points, expiry statuses and licence conditions.

Queensland
In 2020, Queensland trialled digital licences in the Fraser Coast Region. During the Fraser Coast test, users reported a 94 per cent satisfaction rating. The Queensland Government has announced plans to host another trial in Townsville in 2022 and a state-wide roll out in 2023.

Overseas licences
With the exception of the Northern Territory and Victoria, visitors with a temporary visa (other than a permanent visa) from other countries are conditionally permitted to drive with their current overseas drivers licence for the length of their stay. Conditions vary for every state and territory. Generally, drivers must carry their overseas licence with them. A certified translation or International Driving Permit is only required if the licence is not in English, and the original licence must be carried regardless. In NSW, once a driver becomes a permanent resident a local licence should be obtained generally within three months. In Victoria, a resident who is planning on staying for more than 6 months is not permitted to drive with an overseas licence for more than six months (calculated using the visa grant or Australia entry date, whichever is later).

Interstate travel
Interstate visitors are permitted to travel on their current Australian or New Zealand licence. They must obey the local road rules of that state. The differences in state laws have generated much confusion to visiting drivers, with many pushing for uniform federal road rules.

Interstate visitors on their L or P plates must follow the license conditions set of their home state rather than conditions placed upon license-holders of the state which they are visiting i.e, a driver holding an SA provisional license who is visiting New South Wales is able to legally drive at 100 km/h, whereas a NSW provisional driver is restricted to 90 km/h.

Drivers who move interstate must apply for a new driver's licence within three to six months of moving depending on the state they are moving to. Unless a driving test is required, there is no charge for a conversion from a current interstate licence. Usually, licences are converted in the same day, to the same or equivalent class, or, in the case of the conversion of a non-GLS licence to a GLS system, a P1 or P2 licence is issued, depending on the length of time that the holder of the licence has been driving. The licence may need to be confirmed by obtaining a letter from the interstate licence issuing authority (on their letterhead) confirming the licence details (including first issue date) and status.

Drivers moving states may be eligible to upgrade their licence class, due to the varying age rules that apply in each state. For example, a Victorian learner driver who moves to NSW may be eligible to sit the driving test to obtain a P1 licence. However, drivers who are under 18 will not be able to obtain the same licence class in Victoria, where one must be at least 18 to do so. Another example is a Victorian over 25 moving to Tasmania, SA, QLD or WA will be able to obtain a full licence after having held their Ps for 12 months in Victoria despite the fact that the probationary period for over-21-year-olds in Victoria is 3 years.

Interstate commercial driving jobs
Most states do not allow a person to have an interstate commercial driving job if the person does not "reside" in that state.  For example, a person with a Queensland Driver's Licence and Driver's Authority (a variation of the wording Driver's Accreditation) cannot obtain a commercial driving job in South Australia unless that person registers a "residential" address in South Australia, even though they may not live there, and swap over the Driver's Licence and obtain a new Driver's Accreditation.

Suspension or cancellation of licence

Each state has a demerit points system that leads to the suspension of a driver's licence if the demerit point threshold is reached. The rules vary, but road authorities share information about interstate offenses.

In all states, drivers holding a full, unrestricted licence will be disqualified from driving after accumulating 12 demerit points or more within a three-year period, except in New South Wales, where drivers are allowed 13 points in a three-year period. Those who can prove they are professional drivers are allowed an additional point. The minimum suspension period is three months, plus one further month for every extra four demerit points beyond the licence's limit, with a cap in most states of five months (for 8 points or more over the suspension trigger; e.g. 20 points or more on a full licence). An alternative to initially accepting the suspension, a driver can apply for a "good behavior" period of 12 months. In most states, drivers under a good behavior period who accumulate one or two further points (except in Victoria, which does not allow any further offences) have their licence suspended for double the original period.

Most states also provide for immediate suspension of a licence, instead of or in addition to demerit points, in certain extreme circumstances. These generally include offences for driving under the influence of alcohol or other drugs, or for greatly excessive speed.

In some circumstances, driver's licences can be cancelled, either immediately or by court order,  such as for anti-social driving activity, popularly known as hooning.

Drivers on their learner's or provisional license who accrue more than 4 demerit points can sometimes enter a "good behavior" system, in which they are given a license with 1 maximum demerit point for a certain amount of time.

See also
 Australian state and territory issued identity photo cards

References

External links
 South Australia Department for Infrastructure and Transport
The Roads and Maritime Service of New South Wales
A ‘Demonstration’ Driver Knowledge Test for Learner Drivers
Road Users Handbooks (PDF)

Driving in Australia
Australia
Identity documents of Australia